, abbreviated to OUFS or , ,  or   was a national university in Osaka, Japan. It was dedicated to area studies and the study of foreign languages and their related cultures.

History
Osaka University of Foreign Studies (OUFS) was one of Japan's only two national universities specialized in foreign studies. Initially OUFS offered foreign language education in 9 world languages. The number eventually increased to 25, in accordance with OUFS's development as Japan's major center for foreign language education and research.

The history of OUFS dates back to 1921. The founding of the university was supported financially by Choko Hayashi (1873–1945) an Osaka businesswoman, who made a private donation of ¥1,000,000. Based on this donation the Japanese government established the "School of Foreign Affairs (SFS)" in Uehonmachi, Tennoji-ku, Osaka with the aim of nurturing internationally minded personnel in Japan. However its characteristics of the education, specialized in the language and culture of certain society, was commonly understood as a training center of espionage during World War II, and therefore, the school was obliged to be renamed "Osaka College of Foreign Affairs" in April 1944. It moved to Takatsuki, Osaka for a few years after the war and went back to its original site in Osaka city.

In 1949, when the Law on the Establishment of National Schools came into effect, "Osaka University of Foreign Studies (OUFS)" was established based on the existing "Osaka College of Foreign Affairs". It was reformed to offer 12 modern languages as majors.

In 1979 OUFS moved its campus to its present location in Minoh, Osaka for more extensive academic activities. It offered 25 modern languages as majors and 16 ancient and modern languages as minors.

In October 2007, OUFS was consolidated with Osaka University to become "Osaka University School of Foreign Studies (OUSFS)". The merger took several years to be realized because of the conflicts of interest among the academic staff members of OUFS and Osaka University, as well as with the Japanese Government officials aiming public sector reform. Because all academic staffs were public employees, some feared of decreased remuneration at their retirement, while others saw the possibility of losing their position (especially staffs of OUSFS because Osaka University already had similar/same departments and subjects). As a result of harsh negotiations among the three parties, most of the senior academics of OUFS obtained their academic positions at Osaka University, whereas the young professionals at both universities ended up leaving their respective universities regardless of individual academic performance. Since the 2008 academic year, students now apply for their entry through Osaka University.

Student life
OUFS held 2 multicultural festivals every year, which were renowned for ethnic food stalls selling various sorts of international cuisine. Each society at the university held performances or exhibitions. The summer festival's highlight was the Bon Odori, and the November festival consisted of many plays in foreign languages.

Transportation
The OUFS campus is located in the northern suburb in Osaka prefecture. 
The time taken between Osaka University of Foreign Studies and Rail Terminals is around an hour, depending on the mode of transport used. 
The bus leaves from the Hankyuu shopping center towards Osaka-Gaidai mae, which stops right in front of the university. Other buses bound for Madani Jutaku 4 are also available which stop in the nearest residential area. 
Access between OUFS and Osaka University has improved due to the extension of the Osaka Monorail. 
Owing to the recent extension of the Osaka Monorail to Saito-Nishi it takes 15 minutes by walk from the Osaka University of the Foreign Studies campus.

Notable alumni
 Ryotaro Shiba (author, alumni of Osaka School of Foreign Languages)
 Chin Shunshin/Chen Shunchen (author, alumni of Osaka School of Foreign Affairs)

External links
Osaka University of Foreign Studies

Defunct universities and colleges in Japan
Osaka University history
1921 establishments in Japan
Educational institutions established in 1921
2007 disestablishments in Japan
Educational institutions disestablished in 2007